Kontaga is the name of several settlements in Burkina Faso. It may refer to:

 Kontaga, Gounghin, a village in Kouritenga Province
 Kontaga, Tibga, a village in the Tibga Department of Gourma Province
 Kontaga-Peulh, a village in the Tibga Department of Gourma Province